Class 311 may refer to:

 311 series, an electric train type operated in Japan
 British Rail Class 311, an electric train type formerly operated in the UK
 Renfe Class 311, a diesel locomotive type operated in Spain

See also
 311 (disambiguation)